Micro-Star International Co., Ltd (MSI) is a Taiwanese multinational information technology corporation headquartered in New Taipei City, Taiwan. It designs, develops and provides computer hardware, related products and services, including laptops, desktops, motherboards, graphics cards, all-in-one PCs, servers, industrial computers, PC peripherals, car infotainment products, etc.

The company has a primary listing on the Taiwan Stock Exchange and was established on August 4, 1986 by 5 founders – Hsu Xiang (a.k.a. Joseph Hsu), Huang Jinqing (a.k.a. Jeans Huang), Lin Wentong (a.k.a. Frank Lin), Yu Xian'nengyu (a.k.a. Kenny Yu), and Lu Qilong (a.k.a. Henry Lu). First starting its business in New Taipei City, Taiwan, MSI later expanded into China, setting up its Bao'an Plant in Shenzhen in 2000 and establishing research and development facilities in Kunshan in 2001. It also provides global warranty service in North America, Central/South America, Asia, Australia and Europe.

The company has been a sponsor for a number of esports teams and is also the host of the international gaming event MSI Masters Gaming Arena (formerly known as MSI Beat IT). The earliest Beat IT tournament can be traced back to 2010, featuring Evil Geniuses winning the championship.

Operations
MSI's offices in Zhonghe District, New Taipei City, Taiwan serve as the company's headquarters, and house a number of different divisions and services.

Manufacturing initially took place at plants in Taiwan, but has been moved elsewhere. Many MSI graphics cards are manufactured at its plant in China.

The company has branch offices in the Americas, Europe, Asia, Australia and South Africa. As of 2015, the company has a global presence in over 120 countries.

Products

The company first built its reputation on developing and manufacturing computer motherboards and graphics cards. It established its subsidiary FUNTORO in 2008 for the vehicle infotainment market. It provides many computer and tech oriented products including laptops, desktops, monitors, motherboards, graphics cards, power supply products, computer cases and liquid cooler for gamers and content creators, all-in-one PCs, mobile workstations, servers, IPCs, multimedia peripherals, vehicle infotainment, and an autonomous mobility robot.

When established in 1986, MSI focused on the design and manufacturing of motherboards and add-on cards. Later that year, it introduced the first over-clockable 286 motherboard.

In 1989, MSI introduced its first 486 motherboard; in 1990, its first Socket 7 based motherboard; in 1993, its first 586 motherboard; and in 1995, its Dual Pentium Pro-based motherboard. In 1997, it introduced its Intel Pentium II-based motherboard with Intel MMX Technology, along with its first graphics card product and first barebone product. In 2002, it released its first PC2PC Bluetooth & WLAN motherboard. 

In 2000, MSI introduced its first set-top box product (MS-5205); in 2003, its first Pen Tablet PC product (PenNote3100); and in 2004, its first Notebook product (M510C). In 2009, MSI introduced its first Ultra Slim Notebook (X320), and first all-in-one PC (AP1900).

MSI released their first digital audio player in 2003, in a line called MEGA.

In 2008, MSI sponsored Fnatic and dived into the PC gaming market. Its GAMING series features laptops, desktops, motherboards, graphic cards, All-in-One PCs and gaming peripherals designed for gamers and power users.

In 2015, MSI teamed up with eye-tracking tech firm Tobii for the creation of eye-tracking gaming laptops.

In early 2016, MSI announced a collaboration with HTC and has revealed Vive-ready systems to offer Virtual Reality experiences.

MSI expanded its scope of business into Content Creation in 2018 and demonstrated creator-centric laptops at IFA 2018.

The MSI Optix MPG27CQ Gaming Monitor was the recipient of the 27th Taiwan Excellence Gold & Silver Awards.

History
MSI's five founders Joseph Hsu, Jeans Huang, Frank Lin, Kenny Yu and Henry Lu all worked for Sony before establishing MSI. Sony's corporate downsizing in 1985 brought them together. With the engineering background working for Sony, they established Micro Star International together in August 1986.

In 1997, MSI inaugurated Plant I in Zhonghe, followed by the opening of Plant III in Zhonghe in 2000. In the same year, MSI Computer (Shenzhen) Co., Ltd. was established, and in 2001, MSI Electronics (Kunshan) Co., Ltd. was founded. In 2002, MSI set up its European logistics center in the Netherlands. The company went public in 1998 with an IPO on the Taipei Stock Exchange (TAIEX).

In 2003, MSi released the "Mega PC", a shelf stereo computer hybrid with a front panel resembling the former and desktop computer connectors on the rear.

In 2017, MSI signed a laptop distribution deal with Mustek. In April of the same year, MSI names certified partners for the creation of an RGB ecosystem with MSI Mystic Light Sync which includes Corsair, SteelSeries, G.Skill, Cooler Master, InWin, Phanteks, and others.

Also April 2017, MSI launched "Join the Dragon" team sponsorship program to discover talented eSports teams. They have been an influential presence in eSports since, partnering with ESL for ESL One events in 2018 and becoming the official partner of ESL One Cologne 2018, one of the biggest events on the Counter-Strike: Global Offensive calendar. MSI sponsored the Method eSports organization in August 2018. MSI partnered with ESL to bring MGA 2018 grand finals to New York. Kazakhstan's AVANGAR won the Championship.

MSI and Ubisoft jointly presented Ambient Link (synchronized game lighting) on Assassin's Creed Odyssey and Tom Clancy's The Division 2 in 2019.

In September 2020, MSI unveiled a new line of business-oriented laptops under the "Modern", "Prestige", and "Summit" lines, and a new logo specific to these models.

Over the years, MSI has earned numerous awards and recognitions, including being ranked among the Top 20 Taiwan Global Brands in 2008 and named one of the Top 100 Taiwan Brands in 2011. In 2015, Laptop magazine ranked MSI the fourth-best laptop brand of the year, and according to Topology Research Institute, MSI was the largest gaming laptop supplier worldwide in 2016. MSI had also been awarded the Taiwan Excellence award for 15 consecutive years in 2013. In August 2018, MSI was rated the Best Gaming Laptop Brand of 2018 by Laptop Mag. New designs of its GS65 Stealth Thin and GE63 Raider RGB laptops earned the company an 84 out of 100 and put it on the top spot.

On 7 October 2020, MSI released a public statement about their subsidiary Starlit scalping MSI-made Nvidia RTX 3080 and 3090 GPUs, and selling them for higher than MSRP on eBay.

During the 2022 Russian invasion of Ukraine, MSI refused withdraw from the Russian market. Research by Jeffrey Sonnenfeld of Yale University put MSI in the Yale CELI List of Companies category of "Digging In - Defying Demands for Exit or Reduction of Activities", the only Taiwanese company in the database. MSI issued a statement on March 28, 2022, claiming that it abides by all international regulations in terms of its sales and operations in Russia.

Sponsorship
The company once partnered with eSports teams Fnatic and Cloud 9.

It has also been a sponsor for a number of eSports teams worldwide, including METHOD, PENTA Sports, Energy eSports, HWA Gaming, yoe Flash Wolves, NXA-Ladies, Saigon Fantastic Five, MSI-Evolution, Vox Eminor, DeToNator, Team Infused, Aperture Gaming, Phoenix GaminG, Karmine Corp, Aiolikos FC, etc.

MSI announced a partnership with Monster Energy Yamaha MotoGP in February 2022 to support the team with PC hardware throughout the MotoGP season.

See also

List of companies of Taiwan

References

External links
 

Companies listed on the Taiwan Stock Exchange
Computer hardware companies
Electronics companies of Taiwan
Graphics hardware companies
Manufacturing companies based in New Taipei
Motherboard companies
Multinational companies headquartered in Taiwan
Netbook manufacturers
Portable audio player manufacturers
Taiwanese brands
Taiwanese companies established in 1986
Computer enclosure companies
Computer power supply unit manufacturers
Computer hardware cooling
Micro-Star International